
Year 445 (CDXLV) was a common year starting on Monday (link will display the full calendar) of the Julian calendar. At the time, it was known as the Year of the Consulship of Valentinianus and Nomus (or, less frequently, year 1198 Ab urbe condita). The denomination 445 for this year has been used since the early medieval period, when the Anno Domini calendar era became the prevalent method in Europe for naming years.

Events 
 By place 

 Europe 
 Emperor Valentinian III issues an imperial edict against Manichaeism. Heavy penalties are decreed against those who do not denounce the religion, and retain Manichaean books.
 Petronius Maximus, prominent aristocrat, is given the title of Patrician. He becomes the most honored of all non-imperial Romans, and political rival of Flavius Aetius.
 Bleda, co-ruler of the Huns, dies in a hunting accident. He is possibly murdered at the instigation of his younger brother Attila, with whom he has ruled since 434. Now about 39, Attila takes the throne for himself, and becomes king of the Hunnic Empire.

 By topic 

 Religion 
 Domnus II, Patriarch of Antioch, summons a synod of Syrian bishops to confirm the deposition of Athanasius of Perrha.
 Ireland: The Diocese of Armagh is created.

Births

Deaths 
 Arsenius the Great, Desert Father
 King Bleda of the Huns (approximate date)
 Fan Ye, Chinese historian (b. 398)
 Nath Í mac Fiachrach, High King of Ireland

References